The Order of Discalced Augustinians (abbreviation: OAD) is a mendicant order that branched off from the Order of Saint Augustine as a reform movement.

History
During the Counter-Reformation, there was a special interest among the Augustinian friars in the theological debates of the day, as well as a need to return to the roots of their way of life. 

In an effort to seek a more simple and spiritual life, various friars banded together and followed a pattern seen in other mendicant orders, in which simplicity of dress and a stricter form of a life of prayer and penance were embraced. The Discalced Augustinians were formed in 1610 in Italy as a reform movement of the Order and have their own constitutions, differing from those of the other Augustinians.   

Among the Augustinians, there also was an effort to return to the eremitical origins of their Order. Their fasts are more rigorous and their other ascetic practices stricter. As with the Carmelite reform of the same period, these friars came to be known by their practice of wearing sandals, as opposed to shoes (thus the term discalced or barefoot), in an effort to live more like the poor.

This reform was approved by the 100th General Chapter of the Augustinian friars, which was held during May 1592 at the Friary of St. Augustine in Rome, motherhouse of the entire Order. The new branch which thus developed was approved by the Vatican as a separate Order in 1610.

Their current motherhouse is in Rome. Discalced Augustinians take a special fourth vow of humility. 

As of 2018, there were about 220 friars, of which 144 were priests, in 38 houses located in Italy, Brazil and the Philippines.

Nuns
Towards the end of the 16th century communities of female Discalced Augustinians appeared in Spain. The first convent, that of the Visitation, was founded at Madrid, in 1589, by Prudencia Grillo, a lady of noble birth, and received its Constitution from Father Alfonso of Orozco. Juan de Ribera, Archbishop of Valencia (d. 1611), founded a second Discalced Augustinian congregation at Alcoy, in 1597. It soon had houses in different parts of Spain, and in 1663 was established at Lisbon by Queen Louise of Portugal. In addition to the Rule of St. Augustine these religious observed the exercises of the Reformed Carmelites of St. Teresa.

A congregation of Augustinian nuns under the title "Sisters of St. Ignatius" was introduced into the Philippines and South America by the Discalced Augustinian Hermits. They worked zealously in aid of the missions, schools and orphanages in the island, and founded the colleges of Our Lady of Consolation and of St. Anne at Manila, and houses at Neuva Segovia, Cebú and Mandaloya on the Pasig, where they have done much for the education of girls.

Notable members
 Thomas of Jesus

References

External links
The website of the Order (the English version is under construction)
Address of Pope Francis to the General Chapter of the OAD, 2019

Augustinian Order
 
Discalced Augustinians Order